Vugo may refer to:

 Vugo (company), software company that develops rideshare advertising
 VuGo, a portable media player manufactured by Tiger Electronics